Raising Miranda is an American sitcom that aired on CBS in 1988 as part of its fall lineup. Starring James Naughton and Royana Black, it depicted the struggles of a father and his teenage daughter to adjust to their circumstances after their wife and mother abandons their family.

Premise
Donald Marshack, a building contractor in Racine, Wisconsin, suddenly finds himself a single parent when his wife Bonnie attends a self-improvement class and abruptly abandons him and their smart-but-sensitive 15-year-old daughter, Miranda, in order to go and "find herself." The un-domestic Donald is forced to serve as both father and mother to a distressed teenage girl.

Marcine Lundquist is Miranda's lifelong best friend and confidante and Jack Miller is a new transfer student Miranda has befriended at school. Joan and Bob Hoodenpyle are the Marshacks' noodly neighbors and friends. Miranda's wacky and unemployed Uncle Russell is Donald's brother-in-law and buddy and lives in a van permanently parked in the Marshacks' driveway.

Cast
James Naughton as Donald Marshack
Royana Black as Miranda Marshack
Miriam Flynn as Joan Hoodenpyle	
Steve Vinovich as Bob Hoodenpyle	
Amy Lynne as Marcine Lundquist	
Michael Manasseri as Jack Miller	
Bryan Cranston as Russell

Production
Despite its rather grim premise — a wife and mother abandoning her family — the show was billed as a situation comedy, the humor being derived from the Donald Marshack character's challenges in parenting after the departure of his wife.

Portraying Donald's brother-in-law and Miranda's uncle, Russell, Bryan Cranston appeared in his first regular primetime television role in Raising Miranda.

Reception

Raising Miranda received generally poor reviews from critics.

Broadcast history
Raising Miranda aired on CBS on Saturday nights at 8:30 p.m. Eastern Time, up against NBC's hit sitcom Amen. It premiered on November 5, 1988. After seven episodes averaged a poor 6.0 rating, CBS cancelled the series. Its last episode was broadcast on December 31, 1988, leaving two of its nine episodes unaired.

Episodes
SOURCES

References

General
Brooks, Tim and Marsh, Earle, The Complete Directory to Prime Time Network and Cable TV Shows

External links

Raising Miranda opening credits on YouTube
Opening credits for Trial and Error and Raising Miranda on YouTube
1988 CBS promo for Raising Miranda on YouTube

CBS original programming
1980s American sitcoms
1988 American television series debuts
1988 American television series endings
English-language television shows
Television shows set in Wisconsin